The Saint: The Big Bang is a 1990 TV film featuring Simon Dutton as Simon Templar, the crimefighter also known as The Saint. It was one of a series of Saint films produced in Australia and broadcast as part of the syndicated series Mystery Wheel of Adventure.

Plot
The Saint teams up with a newspaper woman to explore the deaths surrounding a corporate takeover.

Cast
 Simon Dutton as Simon Templar
 Morgan Brittany as Verity
 Jerry Di Giacomo as Demoyne
 Jean-Claude Dauphin as Blancpain

Production
This movie was one of six 100-minute TV films, all starring Simon Dutton made for London Weekend Television (LWT) in the United Kingdom, it was postponed due to poor ratings, but went out as part of The Mystery Wheel of Adventure in the United States:
 The Saint: The Brazilian Connection (2 September 1989)
 The Saint: The Blue Dulac (9 September 1989)
 The Saint: The Software Murders (4 August 1990)
 The Saint in Australia (14 July 1990)
 The Saint: Wrong Number (21 July 1990)

Broadcast
The film was broadcast on 28 July 1990.

External links

1990 films
1990 television films
Films directed by Paolo Barzman
1990s English-language films